Doll's Eyes is a painting by Ellen Gallagher. It is in the collection of the Rose Art Museum in Waltham, Massachusetts.

Description
The painting comprises hundreds, if not thousands, of painted eyeballs that look like googley eyes from toys and dolls. From far away it looks like just a wave of pastel and grey shades, but upon closer inspection, the viewer will see the eyes.

History
The painting was acquired by the Rose Art Museum in 1993. It was a gift from Mrs. William H. Fineshriber, Jr. of New York. Doll's Eyes was part of a Gallagher's 2013 solo show at the Tate Modern titled "Your truths are self-evident. Ours, a mystery."

Reception
Art critic Basia Lewandowska Cummings described the painting as recalling "the work of American minimalist Agnes Martin" after she viewed the piece at the Tate Modern.

References

Further reading
Wilson, Judith. "Sniffing Elephant Bones: The Poetics of Race in the Art of Ellen Gallagher." Callaloo. 19(2):337-339. January 996.

1992 paintings
Paintings by Ellen Gallagher